Yemazli may refer to:
Yemazlu, Armenia
Yeməzli, Azerbaijan
Aşağı Yeməzli, Azerbaijan
Orta Yeməzli, Azerbaijan
Yuxarı Yeməzli, Azerbaijan